Maharaja of Benares Palace Ground was a multipurpose stadium in Varanasi. The ground was mainly used for organizing matches of football, cricket and other sports.  The stadium has hosted five first-class match  in 1934 when Maharaj Kumar of Vizianagram's XI played against Marylebone Cricket Club on historic tour of Marylebone Cricket Club in India and Ceylon in 1933/34. The ground hosted two more first-class matches in 1940 to 1942, both of United Provinces cricket team against Hyderabad cricket team and Bengal cricket team. The stadium has hosted non-first-class matches when Benares Hindu University played against Patna University.

Ranji Trophy matches

References

External links 
 cricketarchive
 cricinfo

Cricket grounds in Uttar Pradesh
Sports venues in Varanasi
Defunct cricket grounds in India
Sports venues completed in 1934
1934 establishments in India
20th-century architecture in India